Phallonemertes is a monotypic genus of worms belonging to the monotypic family Phallonemertidae. The only species is Phallonemertes murrayi.

The species is found in Pacific Ocean near Western America.

Etymology
The worm is named for Sir John Murray.

References

Monotypic nemertea genera
Polystilifera
Nemertea genera